Whitework embroidery is any embroidery technique in which the stitching is the same color as the foundation fabric (traditionally white linen). Styles of whitework embroidery include most drawn thread work, broderie anglaise, Hardanger embroidery, Hedebo embroidery, Mountmellick embroidery, reticella and Schwalm. Whitework embroidery is one of the techniques employed in heirloom sewing for blouses, christening gowns, baby bonnets, and other small articles.

Description of the technique 
The term whitework encompasses a wide variety of specific forms of embroidery and can refer to freestyle, counted thread, and canvas-work techniques. Whitework can also be divided into two categories, open and close, depending on whether the threads are cut. Open whitework includes drawn thread work and the related cutwork, in which threads are removed (drawn) from the background fabric, which produces an open, lacy effect. Examples of drawn thread work are broderie anglaise, Madeira, and Hardanger. Close embroidery is also known as pulled work, which  produces an open effect as threads are manipulated, with some being grouped together and others pulled apart.

History 

Different styles of whitework emanated from different areas and at a variety of times in history.  There are examples of pulled thread work from the 1200s. Prior to the 1500s, embroidered clothing and other textiles were limited to the church and to royalty. Dresden work, a pulled thread style, developed in Germany. In the early 1700s, it was popular as a substitute for lace. Broderie anglaise, which features eyelets, was particularly popular in the late 1800s. When the 9th-century tomb of St. Cuthbert was opened in the 12th century, an example of drawn thread work was found in it. Another form of whitework, cutwork, was found throughout Europe, but highly skilled cutwork originated in Italy. In the 1500s, Cardinal Richelieu introduced it to France. It was so popular in the 1500s and 1600s in England that, by law, only the noble classes could wear it.

References

Bibliography
S.F.A. Caulfield and B.C. Saward, The Dictionary of Needlework, 1885.
Virginia Churchill Bath, Needlework in America, Viking Press, 1979 

Embroidery